A water-meadow (also water meadow or watermeadow) is an area of grassland subject to controlled irrigation to increase agricultural productivity.  Water-meadows were mainly used in Europe from the 16th to the early 20th centuries.  Working water-meadows have now largely disappeared, but the field patterns and water channels of derelict water-meadows remain common in areas where they were used, such as parts of Northern Italy, Switzerland and England.  Derelict water-meadows are often of importance as wetland wildlife habitats.

Water-meadows should not be confused with flood-meadows, which are naturally covered in shallow water by seasonal flooding from a river.  "Water-meadow" is sometimes used more loosely to mean any level grassland beside a river.

Types
Two main types of water-meadow were used.

Catchwork water-meadow

These were used for fields on slopes, and relatively little engineering skill was required to construct them.  Water from a stream or spring was fed to the top of a sloping field, and gentle sloping terraces were formed along which the water could trickle in a zig-zag fashion down the field.  The water could be used again for fields lower down the slope.

Bedwork water-meadow
 Bedwork or floated water-meadows were built on almost-level fields along broad river valleys; they required careful construction to ensure correct operation.

A leat, called a main, carrier or top carrier, diverted water from the river and carried it down the valley at a gentler slope than the river, producing a hydrostatic head between the two. The water from the main was used to supply many smaller carriers, on the crests of ridges built across the fields. The channel on the crest of each ridge would overflow slowly down the sides (the panes) of the ridge, the channel eventually tapering to an end at the tip of the ridge. The seeping water would then collect between the ridges, in drains or drawns, these joining to form a bottom carrier or tail drain which returned the water to the river. The ridges and the drains made an interlocking grid (like interlaced fingers), but the ridge-top channels and the drains did not connect directly. A by-carrier took any water not needed for irrigation straight from the main back to the river. The pattern of carriers and drains was generally regular, but it was adapted to fit the natural topography of the ground and the locations of suitable places for the offtake and return of water.

The water flow was controlled by a system of hatches (sluice gates) and stops (small earth or wooden-board dams).  Irrigation could be provided separately for each section of water-meadow.  Sometimes aqueducts took carriers over drains, and causeways and culverts provided access for wagons.  The working or floating (irrigation) and maintenance of the water-meadow was done by a highly skilled craftsman called a drowner or waterman, who was often employed by several adjacent farmers.

The terminology used for watermeadows varied considerably with locality and dialect.

Uses
Water-meadow irrigation did not aim to flood the ground, but to keep it continuously damp – a working water-meadow has no standing water.  Irrigation in early spring kept frosts off the ground and so allowed grass to grow several weeks earlier than otherwise, and in dry summer weather irrigation kept the grass growing.  It also allowed the ground to absorb any plant nutrients or silt carried by the river water – this fertilised the grassland, and incidentally also reduced eutrophication of the river water by nutrient pollution.  The grass was used both for making hay and for grazing by livestock (usually cattle or sheep).

Derelict water-meadows
Former water-meadows are found along many river valleys, where the sluice gates, channels and field ridges may still be visible (however the ridges should not be confused with ridge and furrow topography, which is found on drier ground and has a very different origin in arable farming).  The drains in a derelict water-meadow are generally clogged and wet, and most of the carrier channels are dry, with the smaller ones on the ridge-tops often invisible.  If any main carrier channels still flow, they usually connect permanently to the by-carriers.  The larger sluices may be concealed under the roots of trees (such as crack willows), which have grown up from seedlings established in the brickwork.  The complex mixture of wet and drier ground often gives derelict water-meadows particularly high wetland biodiversity.

Working water-meadows
Derelict water-meadows can be transformed into wildlife protection and conservation areas by repairing and operating the irrigation, as is the case of Josefov Meadows in the Czech Republic. By imitating the natural river flooding which is rare in modern straightened and dammed rivers, a rich biodiversity can be restored and attract and sustain many rare and protected wetland species.

Further reading 
 Hadrian Cook and Tom Williamson (eds.), Water Management in the English Landscape: Field, Marsh and Meadow. Edinburgh: Edinburgh University Press, 1999.

See also 

Flood-meadow
Coastal plain
Field
Flooded grasslands and savannas
Grassland
Pasture
Plain
Prairie
Riparian zone
Wet meadow
Floodplain
Berm

External links 
  — Includes detailed description of bedwork and catchwork water-meadows.
 Upper Test Valley Description of the upper River Test valley in southern England, including description of catchwork water-meadows.
 Harnham Water Meadows Includes animation of water flow.
 Water Meadows: The lush pastures of the river valleys  Description, terminology and diagrams of floated water-meadows.
 PhD thesis abstract on watermeadows
 PhD thesis abstract on watermeadows

 
Meadows
Rivers
Landscape history
Environmental terminology
Water and the environment
History of agriculture
Wetlands